Dorothy 'Dolly' Gubbins (married name Dorothy Evans) was a Welsh international table tennis player.

Table tennis career
She won a silver medal at the 1926 World Table Tennis Championships in the women's singles. Two years later she won a bronze medal in the women's singles and another silver medal at the 1928 World Table Tennis Championships in the women's doubles with Brenda Sommerville. She also won three English Open titles.

Personal life
She moved from Wales to Maidstone in Kent and her daughter June Evans was a county player for Kent. She died in 1961.

See also
 List of table tennis players
 List of World Table Tennis Championships medalists

References

Welsh female table tennis players
1961 deaths
World Table Tennis Championships medalists
Year of birth missing
Sportspeople from Bridgend
Place of death missing
Date of death missing